The World of Man was a Canadian youth nature documentary television series which aired on CBC Television from 1970 to 1975.

Premise
This series featured industry and agriculture in various nations, describing natural resources and human life throughout the world. Episodes featured resource industries such as Australian wool, Argentine ranching, East African diamond mining, East German farming, Egyptian sugar, Finnish lumber, Japanese farming, Libyan oil, Tanzanian coffee and Thailand rice.

Scheduling
The first season of this half-hour series was broadcast Fridays at 4:30 p.m. (Eastern) from 3 April to 25 September 1970. Its next broadcast was two years later, from April to August 1972. In the three following seasons, it aired between July and September each year, until the final broadcast on 20 September 1975.

References*
"John Doe"
"Jane Doe"

References

External links
 

CBC Television original programming
1970 Canadian television series debuts
1975 Canadian television series endings